Ricardo Delgado Nogales (born 13 July 1947) is a Mexican former professional boxer who competed from 1968 to 1975. As an amateur, he won a gold medal at the 1968 Summer Olympics in Mexico City in the flyweight division (−51 kg).

Delgado turned pro in 1968 and had limited success. After being undefeated in his first ten fights, he lost a decision to Davey Vasquez in 1971, a bout in which Delgado was knocked down once in the 5th and 6th rounds. Delgado's career went downhill after the loss and he retired four years later with a career record of having won 14, lost 12, and drawn 5.

1968 Olympic results
Below is the record of Ricardo Delgado, a Mexican flyweight boxer who competed at the 1968 Mexico Olympics:

 Round of 32: bye
 Round of 16: defeated Brendan McCarthy (Ireland) by decision, 5-0
 Quarterfinal: defeated Tetsuaki Nakamura (Japan) by decision, 5-0
 Semifinal: defeated Servílio de Oliveira (Brazil) by decision, 5-0
 Final: defeated Artur Olech (Poland) by decision, 5-0 (won gold medal)

External links
 

1947 births
Living people
Boxers from Mexico City
Flyweight boxers
Boxers at the 1968 Summer Olympics
Olympic boxers of Mexico
Olympic gold medalists for Mexico
Olympic medalists in boxing
Mexican male boxers
Medalists at the 1968 Summer Olympics
Pan American Games silver medalists for Mexico
Boxers at the 1967 Pan American Games
Pan American Games medalists in boxing
Medalists at the 1967 Pan American Games
20th-century Mexican people